Rear Admiral James Thomas Smith (November 1, 1908 – June 28, 1990) was an officer of the United States Navy during World War II.

Early years
Smith was born in Howell, Tennessee, to James Hillary Brewer and Mary Elizabeth (Pickle) Smith.  Following graduation from Lincoln County High School and a year at Bryson Junior College, he entered the United States Naval Academy in 1927, graduating in the class of 1931.  He married Margaret (Peggy) Glasgow of Long Beach, California, in August 1932.

Pre war years
He next had instruction in general line at the Naval Postgraduate School in Annapolis, Maryland, and in September 1939 joined the destroyer  as executive officer.

World War II
During the war in the Pacific he participated in action off Bougainville Island, the Battle of the Coral Sea, attack and occupation of Salamaua-Lae, and in action at Finschhafen, Araw, Manila, Hong Kong, Saigon, Formosa, Okinawa, Tokyo, and Iwo Jima. For his outstanding service during the war he was awarded the Silver Star, the Bronze Star with Combat "V", the Purple Heart, and a Letter of Commendation with Ribbon.

Post war years
In May 1945 Smith was assigned to Reserve Officer Promotions in the Bureau of Naval Personnel, Navy Department, and for a year, June 1947-May 1948, was a student (Senior Course) at the Naval War College, Newport, Rhode Island.  After an assignment on the staff of the Commander First Fleet, he reported in June 1950 as Executive Officer of the Department of Marine Engineering at the Naval Academy.  From July 1952 until September 1953 he commanded the attack transport , operating in the Korean area during the hostilities there, and during August and September 1953 served additionally as Senior Officer Present Afloat at Inchon, Korea.  He was head of the Joint and Combined Operation Section, Amphibious Warfare Branch, Office of the Chief of Naval Operations, Navy Department in 1953 and 1954, after which he was in command of the Naval Receiving Station, San Diego, California.  From November 1957 to retirement in January 1958 he was Assistant Chief of Staff for Administration to the Commandant of the Fourteenth Naval District with headquarters in Pearl Harbor, Hawaii.

Retirement
Upon retirement, Admiral Smith traveled, worked at Idyllwild School of Music and the Arts, pursued hobbies such as leatherwork and photography, and played golf.  He eventually settled in Alpine, California, near San Diego where he died in 1990.  He and his wife Peggy, who died in 1995, are buried at Fort Rosecrans National Cemetery in San Diego.

External links

1908 births
1990 deaths
People from Lincoln County, Tennessee
United States Navy personnel of World War II
United States Navy admirals
Recipients of the Silver Star
People from Alpine, California